Briggsus is a genus of armoured harvestmen in the family Cladonychiidae. There are about five described species in Briggsus, found in the coastal forests of Oregon and Washington.

Species
These five species belong to the genus Briggsus:
 Briggsus bilobatus (Briggs, 1971)
 Briggsus clavatus (Briggs, 1971)
 Briggsus flavescens (Briggs, 1971)
 Briggsus hamatus (Briggs, 1971)
 Briggsus pacificus (Briggs, 1971)

References

Further reading

 
 
 
 

Harvestmen